Sharkey's Machine is the 2004 debut album of Washington, D.C. DJ and producer Sharkey (Shaun Sharkey). Ranging across a variety of styles, this hip hop work features vocalists including Cannibal Ox, Cherrywine ("Butterfly" from Digable Planets), Jean Grae, Grand Puba of Brand Nubian, and The Pharcyde.

Critical reception

Reviews were generally negative, with critics finding the album to be an unexciting take on influences such as RJD2, DJ Shadow, N.E.R.D., and Zero 7. An exception was for the universally-praised track with Jean Grae, "whose tightly delivered vision of a New York apocalypse on "Summer in the City (Lovin' It)" is the album's obvious highlight" (Rollie Pemberton, Pitchfork).

Track listing

Personnel
Sharkey – vocals, keyboards, programming, turntables
Anntoinette Silva – vocals on tracks 1, 7
Zooks – vocals on tracks 1, 16
The GrayKid – co-producer on tracks 2, 8, 17, 18
Mickey Petralia – co-producer on tracks 4, 15
Billy Moon – vocals on track 13

References

External links
Album page at Babygrande
"Summer In The City (Lovin' It)" 12" release
"Fuzz" 12" release
Sharkey interview in Crud Magazine

2004 albums
Babygrande Records albums
Albums produced by Mario Caldato Jr.
Albums produced by Mickey Petralia